Elliot Silverstein (born August 3, 1927) is an American film and television director. He directed the Academy Award-winning western comedy Cat Ballou (1965), and other films including The Happening (1967), A Man Called Horse (1970), Nightmare Honeymoon (1974), and The Car (1977). His television work includes four episodes of The Twilight Zone (1961–1964).

Career
Elliot Silverstein was the director of six feature films in the mid-twentieth century. The most famous of these by far is Cat Ballou, a comedy-western starring Jane Fonda and Lee Marvin.

The other Silverstein films, in chronological order, are The Happening, A Man Called Horse,  Nightmare Honeymoon, The Car, and Flashfire.

Other work included directing for the television shows The Twilight Zone, The Nurses, Picket Fences, and Tales from the Crypt.

While Silverstein was not a prolific director, his films were often decorated. Cat Ballou, for instance, earned one Oscar and was nominated for four more. His high quality work was rewarded in 1990 with a Lifetime Achievement Award by the Directors Guild of America.

Awards
In 1965, at the 15th Berlin International Film Festival, he won the Youth Film Award – Honorable Mention, in the category of Best Feature Film Suitable for Young People for Cat Ballou.
He was also nominated for the Golden Berlin Bear.

In 1966, he was nominated for the DGA Award in the category for Outstanding Directorial Achievement in Motion Pictures (Cat Ballou).

In 1971, he won the Bronze Wrangler award at the Western Heritage Awards in the category of Theatrical Motion Picture for A Man Called Horse, along with producer Sandy Howard, writer Jack DeWitt, and actors Judith Anderson, Jean Gascon, Corinna Tsopei and Richard Harris.

In 1985, he won the Robert B. Aldrich Achievement Award from the Directors Guild of America.

In 1990, he was awarded the DGA Honorary Life Member Award.

Personal life

Silverstein has been married three times, each ending in divorce. His first marriage was to Evelyn Ward in 1962; the couple divorced in 1968. His second marriage was to Alana King. During his first marriage, he was the step-father of David Cassidy.

He currently lives in North Hollywood, Los Angeles. Actively retired, Silverstein has taught film at USC and continues to work on screen plays and other projects.

Filmography
Tales from the Crypt (TV Series) (1991–94) 
Picket Fences (TV Series) (1993) 
Rich Men, Single Women (TV Movie) (1990)
Fight for Life (TV Movie) (1987) 
Night of Courage (TV Movie) (1987)
Betrayed by Innocence (TV Movie) (1986)
The Firm (TV Series) (1982–1983)
The Car (1977)
Nightmare Honeymoon (1974) 
A Man Called Horse (1970)
The Happening (1967) 
Cat Ballou (1965) 
Kraft Suspense Theatre (TV Series) (1963–64) 
The Defenders (TV Series) (1962–64) 
Arrest and Trial (TV Series) (1964) 
The Doctors and the Nurses (TV Series) (1962–64) 
Twilight Zone (TV Series) (1961–64) 
Breaking Point (TV Series) (1963) 
Dr. Kildare (TV Series) (1961–63) 
The Dick Powell Theatre (TV Series) (1962) 
Belle Sommers (TV Movie) (1962)
Naked City (TV Series) (1961–62) 
Have Gun - Will Travel (TV Series) (1961) 
Route 66 (TV Series) (1960–61) 
Checkmate (TV Series) (1961) 
The Westerner (TV Series) (1960) 
Assignment: Underwater (TV Series) (1960) 
Black Saddle (TV Series) (1960) 
Suspicion (TV Series) (1958) 
Omnibus (TV Series) (1954–56)

References

External links

Career interview with Elliot Silverstein at Directors Guild of America

1927 births
Living people
American television directors
Artists from Boston
University of Southern California faculty
Boston College alumni
People from Studio City, Los Angeles
Film directors from Los Angeles